Funeral for an Assassin is a 1974 South Africa film directed by Ivan Hall that was released in the United States in 1977.

Plot
Michael Cardiff is a professional revolutionary highly trained in a variety of techniques of assassination, infiltration and evading law enforcement.  After escaping from prison he places identification items on a decomposed body to make him appear dead as he plans his revenge against the government. Cardiff uses his skills to murder a prominent judge making his death look like an accident in order to plant an improvised explosive device at his funeral attended by the movers and shakers of the regime.  Only one non conformist police captain is on to his plans.

Cast
Vic Morrow as Michael Cardiff
Peter Van Dissel as Capt. Evered Roos
Gaby Getz as Julia Ivens
Sam Williams as Umzinga
Stuart Parker as Commandant Overbeek
Gillian Garlick as Nurse Schoenfeld
Siegfried Mynhardt as Judge William Whitfield
Norman Coombes as Fourie
Chris Bezuidenhout as Karl Yates
Albert Raphael as Claude Ormsby
Bruce Anderson as Prime Minister
Henry Vaughn as Reverend Martin Hemsley
Gwynne Davies as Magdalena Stewart
Nimrod Motchabane as Black Policeman
John Boulter as Surgeon
DeWet Van Rooyen as Minister
Michael Lovegrove as D.I.S. Inspector
Johan Brewis as T.V. Announcer
Michael Jameson as D.I.S. Agent

External links

1974 films
1970s crime drama films
Political thriller films
1970s crime thriller films
English-language South African films
Afrikaans-language films
1974 drama films
Films directed by Ivan Hall